And The Beat Goes On is an English-language  documentary film directed by Steve Jaggi. It was shown  at various film and music festivals between 2009 and 2011. And The Beat Goes On is set on the Mediterranean Island of Ibiza.

And The Beat Goes On was a project of Jimi Mistry for nearly five years, but was not realised until director Steve Jaggi was brought on board. The film was produced by music producer Lionel Hicks, Tina Pehme and Kim Roberts, who served as an executive producer on It's All Gone Pete Tong.

Synopsis
Jimi Mistry, a British actor who grew up during the height of the rave scene in the United Kingdom decides to journey to the Balearic island of Ibiza and unravel the complex musical history of the island, and find if Ibiza's now spoiled reputation is deserved. Starting his journey in clubs such as Pacha and Amnesia, a chance meeting with Island resident and multi platinum producer Lenny Ibizarre ends with Jimi seeking out the island's spiritual flip side. Along the way, Jimi meets DJ Alfredo before re-uniting the four DJs credited with exporting the Balearic sound to England – Paul Oakenfold, Nicky Holloway, Danny Rampling and Johnnie Walker.

Jimi's journey ends with a mountain top full moon ceremony in the center of the Island. The film features interviews with nearly two dozen world famous DJ's and musicians including David Guetta, Danny Tenaglia and features appearances by dozens of musicians and artists including Andy Cato.

Cast

International exhibition and responses
And The Beat Goes On was an official selection at the Ibiza Film Festival 2009, Notting Hill Film Festival 2009 and the 2011 Byron Bay Film Festival. The film has also screened at numerous music festivals, including The Big Chill, Lounge on the Farm and Earth Dance Ibiza.

References

External links
 
 
 WENN / Contact Music Report
 Byron Bay Film Festival

British documentary films
Canadian documentary films
2009 films
Films set in Ibiza
English-language Canadian films
2000s English-language films
2000s Canadian films
2000s British films